Françoise Folmer (born 6 January 1961 in Esch-sur-Alzette) is a Luxembourgish architect and politician. She was named Woman Business Manager of the Year for 2011 by the Banque Internationale à Luxembourg.

In March 2015, she became leader of The Greens. She quit this position in June 2018 to preserve her privacy.

References

External links
Official website

1961 births
Living people
Luxembourgian architects
The Greens (Luxembourg) politicians
People from Esch-sur-Alzette